Amanita citrina (synonym Amanita mappa), commonly known as the false death cap or citron amanita, is a basidiomycotic mushroom, one of many in the genus Amanita. It grows in silicate soil in the summer and autumn months. It bears a pale yellow or sometimes white cap, with white stem, ring and volva. Though not deadly, it is inedible and often confused for the lethal death cap (Amanita phalloides).

Description

The gills and flesh are white. It is often confused with the related death cap mushroom (Amanita phalloides), hence the name.

Distribution and habitat
The false death cap is found in deciduous and coniferous woodlands in Autumn in Europe. It is also found in North American oak and pine forests.

Toxicity
It has been shown that this mushroom contains the alpha-amanitin toxin. However, the amounts of this toxin were found to be very small and would not cause any adverse effects unless the mushroom was ingested in very large amounts. It also contains the toxin bufotenin. Although it is considered inedible, the biggest danger with this species is its marked similarity to the death cap.

This mushroom is not eaten, having a smell of rapeseed or potato.

Gallery

See also

List of Amanita species

References

External links
 Amanita citrina on Mushroomexpert.com

citrina
Poisonous fungi
Fungi of North America
Fungi of Europe
Fungi described in 1797